Roach is an English and Irish surname of Norman origin, derived from the Old French roche (rock), and may refer to:

Politics and government
George Roach (fl. 1870s), Canadian politician
John C. Roach, American jurist on the Kentucky Supreme Court
William N. Roach (1840–1902), American politician

Entertainment
Alexandra Roach, Welsh actress
AJ Roach (born 1975), American singer-songwriter
Archie Roach (1956–2022), Australian musician
Ada Roach, American musical comedy actress
Cameron Roach, British television Producer
Gary D. Roach (born 1964), American film editor
Hal Roach (1892–1992), American director & producer
Hal Roach (comedian), Irish comedian
Jay Roach (born 1957), American director and producer
Max Roach (1924–2007), American drummer
Patrick Roach (born 1969), Canadian actor
Steve Roach (born 1955), American musician

Academics and literature
Kent Roach, Canadian professor
Mary Roach, American author on death and the metaphysical
Stephen S. Roach, American economist
E. M. Roach, Tobagonian poet and playwright

Sports
Andy Roach, American ice hockey defenseman
Clifford Roach (1904–1988), Trinidadian cricketer
Danny Roach (born 1982), Australian rules footballer
Freddie Roach (boxing) (born 1960), American boxing trainer
John Ross Roach (1900–1973), Canadian ice hockey player (Goaltender)
Kemar Roach (born 1988), Barbadian cricketer
Kimmari Roach (born 1990), Jamaican sprinter
Malcolm Roach (born 1998), American football player
Melanie Roach (born 1974), US-American weightlifter of the 53-kg-class
Mel Roach (born 1933), American baseball player
Michael Roach (footballer) (born 1958), Australian rules footballer
Mickey Roach, hockey player
Pat Roach (1937–2004), British wrestler
Alan Roach, sports PA announcer
Paul Roach (American football), American football coach
Ruth Roach (1896–1986), American rodeo performer
Skel Roach (1871–1958), American baseball player and coach
Steve Roach (born 1962), Australian rugby league player
Tom Roach (footballer) (born 1985), Australian rules footballer
Trevor Roach (born 1992), American football player

Other
Colin Roach, British man allegedly murdered by police in 1983
David Roach (disambiguation)
Franklin E. Roach (1905-1993), American astronomer, professor, ufologist, and a father of aeronomy
James Terry Roach (died 1986), American criminal
John Roach (disambiguation)
Mattea Roach (born 1998), Canadian tutor and Jeopardy! champion
Stephen S. Roach (born 1945), American economist

Fictional characters
Roderick Roach
Steven Roach, an alias from a person claiming to have made Polybius.

See also
 Roach (disambiguation)
 Roache
 Roche (disambiguation)

de:Roach
fr:Roach
ru:Роуч

English-language surnames